Sonfjället, also spelled  Sånfjället (local dialect: Sôna), is a national park situated in Härjedalen, in central Sweden. It was established in 1909, making it one of Europe's oldest national parks.

The mountainous area is filled with large boulders, intersected by streaming lakes. Trailing around the mountain area is also a widespread forest area.

The park is noted for the animals living in it: a resident bear tribe, and a large elk tribe. Other animals are also common, including wolves and lynx.

Etymology 
The exact meaning of the word son in this context is not known. It may be related to the Old West Norse word sunna, meaning Sun, and Sonfjället would thus literally mean "the sun fell". This theory has however been disputed and claimed to be inconsistent with the local pronunciation.

From 1919 to 2010, the name was officially spelled as Sånfjället, which the governing body thought better represented the pronunciation, however in June 2010, the official spelling was reverted to Sonfjället.

References

External links 

 Sweden's National Parks: Sånfjället National Park from the Swedish Environmental Protection Agency

National parks of Sweden
Protected areas established in 1909
1909 establishments in Sweden
Geography of Jämtland County
Tourist attractions in Jämtland County